Carnival Games (known in Europe and Australia as Carnival Funfair Games) is a video game for Wii, Nintendo DS and iPhone. It was the last game published by Global Star Software, before it was absorbed into Take-Two Interactive (and what is now 2K Play).

Despite mixed reviews by most gaming websites and critics, the game was a commercial success. The Wii and DS versions of the game sold over six million units as of June 2010, which, according to the NPD Group, was the third best-selling third-party game on the Wii.

As a result of the original's success, a follow-up for the Wii was announced, and launched in the fall of 2008, titled Carnival Games: Mini-Golf. A proper sequel, New Carnival Games, was released on September 21, 2010, for the Wii and Nintendo DS. A new game for PlayStation 4, Xbox One and Nintendo Switch, simply called Carnival Games, was released on November 6, 2018, and for Microsoft Windows (Steam) on November 19, 2020.

Gameplay
The game consists of various mini-games with a carnival theme, such as Alley Bowling, Lucky Cups, Nerves of Steel, Hoops, and Day at the Races, and Buckets Of Fun. These are set up through five different themed areas of the carnival. The player can even win virtual prizes depending on their score. There are many easter eggs hidden as well. The player can also play the multiplayer mode with up to four players by selecting a booth. Games includes ka-pow and hole in 1.

Reception

The Wii version received "mixed" reviews, while the DS version received "generally unfavorable reviews", according to the review aggregation website Metacritic.

The former version received a "Double Platinum" sales award from the Entertainment and Leisure Software Publishers Association (ELSPA), indicating sales of at least 600,000 units in the UK.

Sequels

A follow-up entitled Carnival Games: Mini-Golf was released in the United States on October 21, 2008. A proper sequel, New Carnival Games, was released on September 21, 2010. A virtual reality installment titled Carnival Games VR was released for SteamVR on October 28, 2016, and later ported to PlayStation VR on January 23, 2017. A new game in the series, simply called Carnival Games, was released on November 6, 2018, for PlayStation 4, Xbox One and Nintendo Switch, and on November 19, 2020, for Microsoft Windows (Steam). As of 2018, the series had sold over 9.5 million units.

Reception

The PlayStation 4 version received above-average reviews, while the Switch version received "generally unfavorable reviews", according to Metacritic.

References

External links

2007 video games
2018 video games
2K games
Cat Daddy Games games
Global Star Software games
IOS games
Multiplayer and single-player video games
Nintendo DS games
Nintendo Switch games
Party video games
PlayStation 4 games
Video games developed in the United States
Video games set in amusement parks
Video games using Havok
Wii games
Windows games
Xbox One games